Stetten is a municipality in Rhineland-Palatinate, Germany.  It is in the Kirchheimbolanden Verbandsgemeinde (administrative unit).

History
The first documented record of Stetten occurred in 835.

Stetten was very badly damaged by 1635 due to the Thirty Years' War. 

The region of Stetten, Palatinate was previously a district of the Kingdom of Bavaria.  It became part of Rhineland-Palatinate in 1946.

References

External links
www.kirchheimbolanden.de — official website (in German)
www.ngw.nl — coat of arms
www.tus-stetten.de — TuS 1860 Stetten/Pfalz e. V. (in German)

Donnersbergkreis